Switzerland participated in the 2010 Summer Youth Olympics in Singapore.

Medalists

Archery

Boys

Mixed Team

Athletics

Girls
Track and Road Events

Field Events

Cycling

Cross Country

Time Trial

BMX

Road Race

Overall

Equestrian

Fencing

Group Stage

Knock-Out Stage

Gymnastics

Artistic Gymnastics

Boys

Girls

Trampoline

Rowing

Sailing

One Person Dinghy

Shooting

Pistol

Rifle

Swimming

 * Qualified due to withdrawal of another swimmer

References

External links
Competitors List: Switzerland

2010 in Swiss sport
Nations at the 2010 Summer Youth Olympics
Switzerland at the Youth Olympics